Self (stylized as sElf) is an American alternative pop rock band from Murfreesboro, Tennessee. The band is led by Matt Mahaffey. The band currently consists of Chris James (keyboards, piano, samplers, guitar, backing vocals), Mac Burrus (bass guitar, keyboards, horns, backing vocals), and Jason Rawlings (drums). Past members include Matt's brother, Mike Mahaffey (lead guitar, keyboards, vocals) and Timm Nobles (bass guitar). Mahaffey cites Electric Light Orchestra, Prince, and Pixies as some of his biggest musical influences.

Band history

Self began with founders Matt and Mike Mahaffey recording songs in their childhood home in the early 1990s, following brief forays with other groups. The band's debut album, Subliminal Plastic Motives, was released in 1995 on the Spongebath Records, a label the Mahaffeys helped found. During this early period, the band featured Matt on vocals and guitar, Mike on lead guitar, Tim Nobles on bass, Chris James on keyboards and samplers, and Jason Rawlings on drums.

The album was followed in 1997 by The Half-Baked Serenade, an album released exclusively through a mail order catalog, and in 1997, an album released for free via the Internet called Feels Like Breakin' Shit. Around this time, bassist Timm Nobles was replaced by Mac Burrus, formerly of Murfreesboro rock band The Plain.

An EP titled Brunch (1999) and the album Breakfast with Girls (1999) were co-released by the Spongebath and DreamWorks labels. Back at Spongebath, Self released Gizmodgery in 2000, an album created entirely with children's toy instruments. That same year, Self released two more free Internet-only albums, Self Goes Shopping and Selfafornia. In 2005, Self again released an album for free on the Internet. Porno, Mint & Grime consists of demos recorded during the 2001-2004 sessions for the unreleased album Ornament and Crime.

After a long hiatus, Self released an EP entitled Super Fake Nice in 2014.

In addition to these releases, Self contributed to several tribute albums, covering "Shame" on the Depeche Mode tribute album For the Masses in 1998 and "Ana Ng," for the They Might Be Giants tribute album Hello Radio: The Songs of They Might Be Giants, released in July 2006.

Unreleased music
An album entitled Ornament and Crime was completed in 2004 and was set to become the band's fifth commercial release.  When Universal Music Group acquired DreamWorks Records, the band's label at the time, the album was shelved indefinitely.  A few songs from Ornament and Crime had been featured on the band's MySpace.  After the album spent thirteen quiet years in limbo, Ornament and Crime was released on August 25, 2017 via El Camino Media, who had previously released Super Fake Nice in 2014.

A live video, intended to be released on home video formats, remains unreleased. Recorded in 2005 at Spaceland, the performance includes a cover of AC/DC's hit song "Back in Black." Several videos of songs from the DVD, including the "Back in Black" cover, have been posted online on Mahaffey's MySpace and YouTube profiles.

Side projects and Super Fake Nice (2005-present)
New music and live performances since the release of Porno, Mint & Grime have been sporadic. Lead guitarist Mike Mahaffey died in May 2005, and his role in the band has yet to be filled, though the remaining members played a show in his honor on October 9, 2005. They have performed since as a full band and Matt Mahaffey has appeared as Self in solo performances. Despite this, members of the band have been working primarily on other projects. Rawlings played drums in a group called Suburban Tragedy, and Mahaffey also formed a new band, Wired All Wrong, with former God Lives Underwater member Jeff Turzo. Wired All Wrong released their first album, Break Out The Battle Tapes on September 12, 2006. Additionally, Matt has worked as a producer and performer for other artists including Beck and Hellogoodbye and as a composer for children's TV shows including Nickelodeon's Ni Hao, Kai-Lan.

On January 13, 2007, Mahaffey announced on his MySpace blog that a new Self album, tentatively titled Super Fake Nice, was in the works. In late 2008, several new tracks appeared on his MySpace. On May 19, 2010, Self-released the single "Could You Love Me Now?" for digital download. In July 2011, work on a new studio album was said to be progressing, and Mahaffey stated that he was considering Kickstarter as a means of funding the project. On November 30, 2011, Self made available the track "Looks and Money" for digital download. Matt Mahaffey officially announced the production of the new Self album on December 15, 2011.

As of 2012, Mahaffey has permanently returned to the Nashville area. Self played a sold-out reunion show in Nashville on December 29, 2012 at Exit/In with Fluid Ounces guitarist Brian Rogers filled Mike Mahaffey's guitar slot.

Discography

Albums

Compilations

EPs
Brunch (1999)
Super Fake Nice (2014)

Singles
"Cannon" (1995) Spongebath Records
"So Low" (1996) BMG
"KiDdies"/"Suzie Q Sailaway" (1999) DreamWorks Records
"Meg Ryan" (1999) DreamWorks Records
"Could You Love Me Now?" (2010) Self Digital
"Looks and Money" (2011) Fresh Imperial
"Monogamy/Could You Love Me Now" (2015) Release the Krakken/Music Of Big Deal (BMI)

References

External links

 [ Allmusic - Self biography]
 Matt Mahaffey / Self MySpace page
 Self's discography at the Discogs database

Alternative rock groups from Tennessee
Fat Possum Records artists